The 2000 Green National Convention was held on July 23–25, in Denver, Colorado. The convention was convened by the Association of State Green Parties, which was later to be renamed the Green Party of the United States. The convention nominated Ralph Nader for president and Winona LaDuke for vice president.

Convention Floor Vote
Ralph Nader, (District of Columbia): 295
Jello Biafra, (California): 10
Stephen Gaskin, (Tennessee): 10
Joel Kovel, (New York): 3
Abstain:1
Total: 319

See also
Green National Convention
Other parties' presidential nominating conventions of 2000:
Libertarian
Democratic
Republican

References

External links
Ralph Nader acceptance speech
Green Officeholders Speeches
Jim Hightower plenary speech
Manning Marable plenary speech

2000 United States presidential election
Green Party of the United States National Conventions
2000 in Colorado
History of Denver
Political conventions in Colorado
2000 conferences
Green National Convention
Conventions in Denver